Jackson County is a county located in the northeastern part of the U.S. state of Georgia. As of the 2020 census, the population was 75,907. The county seat is Jefferson.

Jackson County comprises the Jefferson, GA Micropolitan Statistical Area, which is included in the Atlanta-Athens-Clarke County-Sandy Springs, GA Combined Statistical Area.

History
Most of the first non-Native American settlers came from Effingham County in 1786. On February 11, 1796, Jackson County was split off from part of Franklin County, Georgia. The new county was named in honor of Revolutionary War Lieutenant Colonel, Congressman, Senator and Governor James Jackson.

In 1801, the Georgia General Assembly granted  of land in Jackson County for a state college. Franklin College (now University of Georgia) began classes the same year, and the city of Athens was developed around the school. Also the same year, a new county was developed around the new college town, and Jackson lost territory to the new Clarke. The county seat was moved to an old Indian village called Thomocoggan, a location with ample water supply from Curry Creek and four large springs. In 1804, the city was renamed Jefferson, after Thomas Jefferson.

Jackson lost more territory in 1811 in the creation of Madison County, in 1818 in the creation of Walton, Gwinnett, and Hall counties, in 1858 in the creation of Banks County, and in 1914 in the creation of Barrow County.

The first county courthouse, a log and wooden frame building with an attached jail, was built on south side of the public square; a second, larger, two-story brick courthouse with a separate jailhouse was built in 1817. In 1880, a third was built on a hill north of the square. This courthouse was the oldest continuously operating courthouse in the United States until 2004, when the current courthouse was constructed north of Jefferson.

Law and government

Geography

The vast majority of Jackson County is located in the Upper Oconee River sub-basin of the Altamaha River basin, with just a small portion of the county's northern edge, between Maysville to just east of Commerce, located in the Broad River sub-basin of the Savannah River basin.

Rivers and creeks
 North Oconee River
 Sandy Creek (Georgia)
 Curry Creek
 Middle Oconee River
 Pond Fork
 Allen Creek (Holders Creek)
 Mulberry River

Adjacent counties
 Banks County - north
 Madison County - east
 Clarke County - southeast
 Gwinnett County - southwest
 Barrow County - west
 Hall County - northwest

Transportation

Major highways

  Interstate 85
  U.S. Route 129
  U.S. Route 129 Business
  U.S. Route 441
  U.S. Route 441 Business
  State Route 11
  State Route 11 Business
  State Route 11 Connector
  State Route 15
  State Route 15 Alternate
  State Route 53
  State Route 59
  State Route 60
  State Route 82
  State Route 82 Connector
  State Route 98
  State Route 124
  State Route 330
  State Route 332
  State Route 334
  State Route 335
  State Route 346 (former)
  State Route 403 (unsigned designation for I-85)

Pedestrians and cycling

 Fox Smallwood Dr Trail
 American Veterans Memorial Park Trail
 Commerce Middle School Track
 Curry Creek Reservoir Trail
 Jefferson Memorial Stadium Track
 East Jackson Park Walking Trail
 South Jackson Elementary Nature Trail & Walking Track
 Hurricane Shoals Nature Trail
 Sells Mill Nature Trail
 Sandy Creek Park Walking Trail
 Braselton Riverwalk Trail
 East Jackson High School Track
 W Jackson Middle School Track
 West Jackson Park Walking Track
Jackson County High School Track & Nature Trail

Demographics

2000 census
As of the census of 2000, there were 41,589 people, 15,057 households, and 11,488 families living in the county.  The population density was 122 people per square mile (47/km2).  There were 16,226 housing units at an average density of 47 per square mile (18/km2).  The racial makeup of the county was 89.00% White, 7.78% Black or African American, 0.18% Native American, 0.96% Asian, 1.07% from other races, and 1.01% from two or more races.  3.00% of the population were Hispanic or Latino of any race.

There were 15,057 households, out of which 36.30% had children under the age of 18 living with them, 60.50% were married couples living together, 10.80% had a female householder with no husband present, and 23.70% were non-families. 19.70% of all households were made up of individuals, and 7.30% had someone living alone who was 65 years of age or older.  The average household size was 2.71 and the average family size was 3.10.

In the county, the population was spread out, with 26.60% under the age of 18, 8.70% from 18 to 24, 31.80% from 25 to 44, 22.50% from 45 to 64, and 10.40% who were 65 years of age or older.  The median age was 35 years. For every 100 women there were 100.40 males.  For every 100 females age 18 and over, there were 97.80 males.

The median income for a household in the county was $40,349, and the median income for a family was $46,211. Males had a median income of $34,063 versus $22,774 for females. The per capita income for the county was $17,808.  About 9.90% of families and 12.00% of the population were below the poverty line, including 13.30% of those under age 18 and 17.90% of those age 65 or over.

2010 census
As of the 2010 United States Census, there were 60,485 people, 21,343 households, and 16,479 families living in the county. The racial makeup of the county was 86.8% white, 6.8% black or African American, 1.7% Asian, 0.2% American Indian, 2.7% from other races, and 1.8% from two or more races. Those of Hispanic or Latino origin made up 6.2% of the population. In terms of ancestry,

Of the 21,343 households, 40.2% had children under the age of 18 living with them, 60.9% were married couples living together, 11.3% had a female householder with no husband present, 22.8% were non-families, and 18.7% of all households were made up of individuals. The average household size was 2.80 and the average family size was 3.18. The median age was 37.1 years.

The median income for a household in the county was $51,506 and the median income for a family was $58,239. Males had a median income of $43,906 versus $33,248 for females. The per capita income for the county was $22,473. About 11.7% of families and 15.1% of the population were below the poverty line, including 19.7% of those under age 18 and 12.1% of those age 65 or over.

2020 census

As of the 2020 United States census, there were 75,907 people, 25,180 households, and 19,467 families residing in the county.

Education
 Commerce City School District
 Jackson County School District
 Jefferson City School District

Attractions
 Chateau Elan (Braselton)
 La Vaquita Flea Market (Pendergrass)
 Mayfield Dairy Visitors Center (Braselton)
 Sandy Creek Golf Course (Commerce)
 Tanger Outlet Center (Commerce)

National Historic Places 

 Braselton Historic District
 Commerce Commercial Historic District
 Governor L. G. Hardman House (Commerce)
 Hillcrest-Allen Clinic and Hospital (Hoschton)
 Holder Plantation (Jefferson)
 Hoschton Depot
 Old Jackson County Courthouse (Jefferson)
 Jefferson Historic District
 Oak Avenue Historic District(Jefferson)
 Paradise Cemetery (Jefferson)
 Seaborn M. Shankle House (Commerce)
 Shields-Etheridge Farm
 Talmo Historic District
 Williamson-Maley-Turner Farm (Jefferson)

Parks and cultural institutions 
 Crawford W. Long Museum (Jefferson)
 Hurricane Shoals Park

Events

 Daisy Festival - May (first full weekend) (Nicholson)
 Mule Days - May (Shields-Etheridge Farm)
 Annual City Lights Festival - mid-June (Commerce)
 Celebrate Braselton - July 4 (Braselton)
 Art in the Park - mid-September (Hurricane Shoals)
 Annual Fall Festival - September (last weekend) (Hoschton)
 Jefferson High School and Jefferson Middle School Band Concerts - throughout the year (Jefferson)
 Jackson County Comprehensive High School, East Jackson Comprehensive High School, East Jackson Middle, and West Jackson Middle School Band Concerts - throughout the year

Communities

Cities 

 Arcade
 Braselton (partly in Gwinnett, Barrow and Hall)
 Commerce
 Hoschton
 Jefferson
 Maysville (partly in Banks)
 Nicholson
 Pendergrass
 Talmo

Unincorporated communities
 Apple Valley
 Attica
 Brockton
 Center
 Clarksboro

See also

 National Register of Historic Places listings in Jackson County, Georgia
List of counties in Georgia

References

External links
 Jackson County government website
 Jackson County historical marker
 Atlanta Dragway
 Mayfield Dairy
 Chateau Elan
 Sandy Creek Golf Course
 Tanger Outlet Center
 Traditions of Braselton
 Crawford W. Long Museum
 Hurricane Shoals Park

 
Georgia (U.S. state) counties
1796 establishments in Georgia (U.S. state)
Counties of Appalachia
Populated places established in 1796